Ernest Eric Crossan (3 November 1915 – 10 August 2009) was an Australian cricketer. Having played as a right-handed batsman and right-arm medium pace bowler for New South Wales from 1937 to 1946, Crossan was at the time of his death the last surviving New South Wales player to have appeared for the team before the Second World War. "He was the last link to an era of great players, including former Australian representatives, Stan McCabe, Bill O'Reilly, Bert Oldfield, Sid Barnes, Arthur Chipperfield and Jack Fingleton, who all played alongside Ern in his debut match in 1937" wrote David Gilbert, Chief Executive of the club.

Crossan played four first class games in his career, scoring 103 runs at 14.71, with a best of 35*. He took a single wicket. His death left Harold Stapleton as the oldest surviving New South Wales player.

See also
 List of New South Wales representative cricketers

References

External links

1915 births
2009 deaths
Australian cricketers
New South Wales cricketers
Cricketers from Melbourne